Parliament House, also referred to as Capital Hill or simply Parliament, is the meeting place of the Parliament of Australia, and the seat of the legislative branch of the Australian Government. Located in Canberra, the Parliament building is situated on the southern apex of the Parliamentary Triangle atop Capital Hill, at the meeting point of Commonwealth, Adelaide, Canberra and Kings Avenue enclosed by the State Circle.

Parliament House was designed by Mitchell/Giurgola & Thorp Architects and built by a Concrete Constructions and John Holland joint venture. It was opened on  1988 by Elizabeth II, Queen of Australia. It cost more than A$1.1 billion (equivalent to about $ billion in ) to build.

Federal Parliament meetings were held in Melbourne until 1927. Between 1927 and 1988, the Parliament of Australia met in the Provisional Parliament House, which is now known as "Old Parliament House". The construction of Australia's permanent Parliament House was delayed while its location was debated. Construction of the new building began in 1981. The principal design of the structure is based on the shape of two boomerangs and is topped by an  flagpole.The flag that is hoisted on this pole is one of the largest hoisted in the country.Their measurements had

The Parliament House contains 4,700 rooms, and many areas are open to the public. The main foyer contains a marble staircase and leads to the Great Hall, which has a large tapestry on display. The House of Representatives chamber is decorated green, while the Senate chamber has a red colour scheme. Between the two chambers is the Members' Hall, which has a water feature and is not open to the public. The Ministerial Wing houses the Prime Minister's Office and other ministerial offices.

Before the establishment of Canberra

In 1901, when the six British colonies in Australia federated to form the Commonwealth of Australia, Melbourne and Sydney were the two largest cities in the country, but the long history of rivalry between them meant that neither could become the national capital. Section 125 of the Constitution of Australia therefore provided that:

The seat of Government of the Commonwealth shall be determined by the Parliament and shall be within a territory which shall have been granted to or acquired by the Commonwealth, and shall be vested in and belong to the Commonwealth, and shall be in the State of New South Wales, and be distant not less than one hundred miles from Sydney.

Such territory shall contain an area of not less than one hundred square miles, and such portion thereof as shall consist of Crown lands shall be granted to the Commonwealth without any payment therefor. The Parliament shall sit at Melbourne until it meet at the seat of Government.

In 1909, after much argument, the Parliament decided that the new capital would be in the southern part of New South Wales, on the site which is now Canberra. The Commonwealth acquired control over the land in 1911, but World War I intervened, and nothing was done for some years to build the city. Federal Parliament did not leave Melbourne until 1927.

In the meantime the Australian Parliament met in the 19th-century edifice of Parliament House, Melbourne, while the Victorian State Parliament met in the nearby Royal Exhibition Building for 26 years.

Old Parliament House

After World War I the Federal Capital Advisory Committee was established to prepare Canberra to be the seat of government, including the construction of a Parliament House. The committee decided that it would be best to erect a "provisional" building, to serve for a predicted 50 years until a new, "permanent" House could be built. In the end, the Old Parliament House was Parliament's home for 61 years. In the last decade of its use as a parliament, the building had a chronic shortage of available space.

New Parliament House

Design and construction
In 1978 the Fraser government decided to proceed with a new building on Capital Hill, and the Parliament House Construction Authority was created. A two-stage competition was announced, for which the Authority consulted the Royal Australian Institute of Architects and, together with the National Capital Development Commission, made available to competitors a brief and competition documents. The design competition drew 329 entries from 29 countries.

The competition winner was the Philadelphia-based architectural firm of Mitchell/Giurgola, with the on-site work directed by the Italian-born architect Romaldo Giurgola, with a design which involved burying most of the building under Capital Hill, and capping the edifice with an enormous spire topped by a large Australian flag. The facades, however, included deliberate imitation of some of the patterns of the Old Parliament House, so that there is a slight resemblance despite the massive difference of scale.

Giurgola placed an emphasis on the visual aesthetics of the building by using landscape architect Peter G. Rolland to direct civil engineers, a reversal of the traditional roles in Australia. Rolland played a pivotal role in the design, development and coordination of all surface elements including pool design, paving, conceptual lighting and artwork locations. Horticultural experts from the Australian National Botanic Gardens and a government nursery were consulted on plant selection. Permanent irrigation has been limited to only the more formal areas. Irwinconsult was commissioned to provide structural engineering, including quality assurance of all structural elements, to deliver a building with a designed lifespan of 200 years.

Construction began in 1981, and the House was intended to be ready by Australia Day,  1988, the 200th anniversary of European settlement in Australia. It was expected to cost . Neither the deadline nor the budget was met.

In 1983, Mitchell/Giurgola & Thorp, commissioned the forecourt mosaic, Possum and Wallaby Dreaming, which Aboriginal Australian artist Michael Nelson Jagamarra, of Papunya, Northern Territory, based on his painting of the same name. The mosaic shows "a gathering of a large group of people from the kangaroo, wallaby and goanna ancestors [who] are meeting to talk and to enact ceremonial obligations. The work derives from the sand-painting tradition of the Warlpiri people, and has complex layers of meaning known only to Warlpiri elders". Three stonemasons took 18 months to two years to hand-cut the 90,000 granite setts which were used in the  artwork. The mosaic was digitised in April 2019 from a series of photographs taken from five metres above the artwork.

The building was opened by Queen Elizabeth II on  1988, the anniversary of the opening of both the first Federal Parliament in Melbourne on  1901 by the Duke of Cornwall and York (later King George V), and of the Provisional Parliament House in Canberra on  1927 by the Duke of York (later King George VI).

The flagpole weighs 250 tonnes and is made of polished stainless steel from Wollongong. It was designed to be the pinnacle of Parliament House and is an easily recognisable symbol of national government. It is visible by day from outside and inside Parliament House and floodlit at night.

The building was designed to sit above Old Parliament House when seen from a distance. The building is four metres (13 feet) higher than the original height of the hill. About one million cubic metres (35,000,000 cubic feet) of rock had to be excavated from the site. It was used to fill low-lying areas in the city. Most of the granite used was sourced from Australia. Twice the amount needed was quarried as a very high standard of granite was required particularly for the curved walls.

It was proposed originally to demolish Old Parliament House so that there would be an uninterrupted vista from the New Parliament House to Lake Burley Griffin and the Australian War Memorial, but there were successful representations for the preservation of the historic building, which now houses a parliamentary museum. The original idea was for Parliament House to be open free to the public, and the sweeping lawns leading up to the entrances were intended to symbolise this.

Layout 

The  forecourt mosaic, Possum and Wallaby Dreaming, was designed by Indigenous Australian artist Michael Nelson Jagamarra, and represents a gathering of people. (See also above.)

The public entrance to Parliament House opens into the main foyer leading into the Great Hall, which features a tapestry based on a painting by Arthur Boyd, the original of which is also displayed in the building. Functions that have parliamentary and federal relevance often take place here, but the Great Hall is also open to functions for the general public, such as weddings, and the nearby University of Canberra hosts graduation ceremonies here.

Below the tapestry of the Great Hall is a removable division that opens onto the Members' Hall, which has a water feature at its centre. This is an area restricted to security-classified occupants of the building and special visitors. Directly ahead of the Members' Hall is the Ministerial Wing, housing the office suites of the Prime Minister and government Ministers. The Members' Hall has access to the House of Representatives and the Senate buildings to the left and right of the main entrance to the halls respectively. Public access to the visitors' galleries and the Main Committee Room is via an upper level reached by impressive marble staircases ascending from the entrance foyer. There are also 19 committee rooms that are open to the public and a highly secure Cabinet Room on the ground floor.

House of Representatives 

In commemoration of the colour scheme of the British House of Commons, the House of Representatives is decorated in green. However, the colour is muted to suggest the colour of eucalyptus leaves, or the Australian bush.

The Chamber itself is designed to seat up to 172 members, with room to accommodate a total of 240 with temporary seating. From the perspective of the image, the press gallery is ahead, with public galleries containing 388 seats to the left and right. Soundproofed galleries for school groups are directly above these, as no talking is permitted when the House members are present.

Frontbench (Cabinet) members approach the table with the ornate box (pictured), known as the despatch box, to speak. Backbenchers have a microphone on their desk and merely stand to speak (unless they cannot stand), in accordance with standing order 60.

Also on the table is a copy of Hansard and where the clerk and deputy clerk sit. The clerk needs to know all the rules of Parliament and is responsible for ringing the bells during a division (voting). In front of the clerk are the hour glasses. The outer glasses measure four minutes and the middle glass measures one minute. These glasses are turned when there is a division; one of the four-minute glasses is turned and the bells will ring and the clocks will flash green for the House of Representatives or red for the Senate for four minutes. After the hourglass stops, the house's attendants will lock the doors and the whips will count the votes. Members vote by either moving to the government side of the house for a vote for a bill or the opposition side for a vote against a bill. If there are successive divisions, and there is no debate after the first division, the middle one-minute hourglasses are turned and the bells are rung for one minute.

As is the custom with Westminster parliaments, members of the governing party sit to the Speaker's right, and the Opposition sits to the Speaker's left. Independents and minor parties sit on the cross-benches. The long benches (the front benches) closest to the despatch boxes are reserved for the Cabinet on the government's side and the Shadow Cabinet on the Opposition's side.

Senate 

The Senate chamber matches the colour scheme of the House of Lords, decorated in red, but muted to tints of ochre, suggesting the earth and the colours of the outback.

Presently installed seating can accommodate up to 93 Senators. The gallery arrangement is almost identical to that of the House of Representatives. Unlike the House of Representatives, only the leader of the government or opposition in the Senate approaches the lectern; other frontbench senators and all backbench senators have a desk microphone. As can be seen from the illustrations, unlike the House of Representatives, there is no distinction between the front and back benches in the Senate chamber; Senate ministers and their opposition counterparts have the same two-seat benches as all other senators. The press gallery is located above the Senate chamber. The presiding officer of the Australian Senate is the President of the Senate, who occupies a position in the Senate chamber similar to that of the Speaker of the House of Representatives. Behind the seat of the President of the Senate are two large seats which are modern versions of thrones. The larger is used by the Governor-General or the monarch (when visiting) when they open Parliament at the start of a new parliamentary session. The vice-regal consort or the royal consort (when visiting) sits on the smaller throne.

Art collection 
The Parliament House Art Collection of over 6,000 works includes commissioned (and purchased) portraits of every prime minister, governor-general, president of the senate and speaker of the house, as well as other works of art significant to Australia.

Reception 
The New Parliament House building has been warmly received for its beauty and democratic symbolism, particularly the grass-covered roof that allows visitor access. Member for Fenner, Andrew Leigh has praised the way "the building was constructed to emerge out of Capitol Hill – rather than sitting atop it as an imposing structure". The new Parliament House is recognised as being more spacious and light-filled than its predecessor, and much less cramped.

The building has received criticism for the way in which its design discourages collegiality amongst members. New Parliament House was designed in the late 1970s, in the context of the Sydney Hilton Hotel bombing and the tense political climate following the Dismissal of the Whitlam Government, and thus one of the key elements of the design brief was providing security for the executive. The winning design's solution was to fence off the executive in its own ministerial wing. In practice, this meant it was no longer possible for backbenchers to bump into ministers while passing through the corridors of parliament, increasing a sense of detachment between the two groups. The heart of Old Parliament House was King's Hall, an entrance hall open to the public that connected the House of Representatives and the Senate to the parliamentary library and the refreshment rooms. Inevitably, due to its central location, Kings Hall became a bustling hub where people met and talked, and a place where politicians could mingle with the public and the press gallery. In contrast, the new building situates the library and refreshment rooms at great distance from the two Chambers, and Member's Hall, the foyer that connects the House and the Senate, is not open to the public. As a consequence, Member's Hall lies empty, as parliamentarians have no reason to be there.

Similarly, while in the Old Parliament House members of various political parties would inhabit offices that shared the same corridors, New Parliament House segregates opposing parties in different corners of the building, decreasing interaction between members. Members would often only meet their opponents in the adversarial environment of the debating chamber, and many former parliamentarians believe this has heightened the sectarian nature of parliamentary politics in Australia.

Don Watson, speechwriter for former Prime Minister Paul Keating, writes: The place lacks red blood cells. Beyond the chambers there is no sign of the great contest of ideas for which a national parliament exists. Unlike the old Parliament House where opponents bumped past each other in the corridors, met each other's eyes, exchanged brutalities in the bar, stood side by side at urinals, in the new building the Opposition is separated from the Government by a divide as great as any which separates all of them from their constituents. As with dogs which meet only through a fence and cannot sniff each other's backsides, it deepens the everyday animus. Paul Keating himself has lamented walking the corridors of New Parliament House "not feeling like you were part of anything". Another former Prime Minister, Malcolm Turnbull, expressed concern the "badly designed" structure lacks "collision space [that] brings people together to...compromise and agree and discuss. I think the design of the building definitely contributes to the fact that there are less cross-party friendships than there were in the old parliament". These concerns have been echoed by many former parliamentarians, including Malcolm Fraser, Tom Uren, Peter Walsh, Barry Jones, and Bob Carr. Walsh, a former Finance Minister in the Hawke Government has said the building is "an antiseptic, isolated and impersonal place, compared with its predecessor".

Function events 
The new Parliament House is a central hub for events in Canberra, hosting many of the nation's largest and most important function events. The Parliament House is a place for meetings, conferences (government, and private), celebrations, and other miscellaneous uses. The Parliament House is one of the few parliament houses in the world where private events are permitted. The Parliament House has 14 event spaces that can be used for special events.

Solar power project
In 2011, the Department of Parliamentary Services commissioned a pilot 43.3 kW photovoltaic system on the roof of Parliament House in Canberra. The system is split between two locations, with 192 panels installed on the Senate wing with the remaining 42 panels on the roof of the Gardeners' Compound. At the time of construction, the system was one of the largest installed for solar power in Australia.

According to the Department of Parliamentary Services, the system was switched on in June 2011 and has performed as expected by providing enough power for lighting in both the House of Representatives and the Senate. This equates to an approximate saving of $9,000 which is expected to rise to $17,000 annually.

The system received an award from the Clean Energy Council in 2012 for "Best design and installation of a grid-connect power system greater than 10 kW".

Engineering heritage award 
Both the old and new Parliament House received an Engineering Heritage National Marker from Engineers Australia as part of its Engineering Heritage Recognition Program.

Criminal acts
Over the years there have been some criminal acts committed in the Australian Parliament house. This was known as the 2021 Australian Parliament House sexual misconduct allegations.

See also

 Australian landmarks
 Government of Australia

References

Books, letters, articles, websites
 
 
 
 
 
 
 
 
 Watson, Don (2002). Recollections of a Bleeding Heart: A Portrait of Paul Keating. Random House Australia. 
 Jones, Barry (2006). A Thinking Reed. Allen & Unwin. 
 Boyd, Penleigh (2018), After 30 years, does Parliament House serve politicians and people? The Canberra Times.

External links

 Parliament of Australia
 Old Parliament House
 Parliament House / image trail from Picture Australia.
 This Australian ABC page gives an account of the new Parliament House.
 Australianexplorer Parliament House tourism site.
 Todae Solar Parliament House Solar Power Case Study
 Australian Parliament House Project Page

Legislative buildings in Australia
Parliament of Australia
Buildings and structures in Canberra
Landmarks in Canberra
Seats of national legislatures
Tourist attractions in Canberra
Government buildings completed in 1988
1988 establishments in Australia
Modernist architecture in Australia
Recipients of Engineers Australia engineering heritage markers